Chiaksan is a mountain in the province of Gangwon-do, South Korea. Its area extends across the city of Wonju and the county of Hoengseong.

See also
List of mountains in Korea

References

Mountains of Gangwon Province, South Korea
Wonju
Hoengseong County
Mountains of South Korea
One-thousanders of South Korea